Mohammed Mbye (born 18 June 1989) is a Gambian footballer who plays as a defender for Division 2 Östra Götaland club Ifö Bromölla IF.

Early life
Mbye was born in The Gambia and moved to Sweden with his family at the age of eleven in 2001.

Club career
Mbye began his career with Hammarby IF, when he moved to Sweden in 2001 to join the children's section of Hammarby Talang FF, the farm team of Hammarby IF. He moved in July 2007 to French club Rennes, where he played five games in the reserves and scored one goal. In 2008, Mbye joined Assyriska Föreningen, signing a three-year contract which running until 31 December 2012.

International career
Mbye represented The Gambia at under-20 level before playing for the country's senior national team.

Honours
Rennes

 Coupe Gambardella: 2008

References

External links
 

1989 births
Living people
Gambian footballers
The Gambia international footballers
The Gambia youth international footballers
Association football midfielders
Hammarby Fotboll players
Assyriska FF players
Elverum Fotball players
Kristianstad FC players
Mjällby AIF players
Gambian expatriate footballers
Expatriate footballers in Sweden
Gambian expatriate sportspeople in Sweden
Expatriate footballers in France
Gambian expatriate sportspeople in France
Expatriate footballers in Norway
Gambian expatriate sportspeople in Norway
Norwegian First Division players
Superettan players
Ettan Fotboll players
2021 Africa Cup of Nations players